Alan, Abbot of Tewkesbury (date of birth unknown) is said by Gervase of Canterbury (contemporary chronicler) to be of English (i.e. non-Norman) descent. He probably spent some time at Benevento (Italy). Became a monk at Canterbury, rising to prior in 1179. In the struggle between Thomas of Canterbury and Henry II, he was a strong supporter of Thomas. As a result, he went to Tewkesbury as abbot where he was out of Henry's way.

His works are written about in Life of St. Thomas printed (as Life of Becket) in the second volume of Materials for the History of Thomas Becket, edited by James Craigie Robertson (Rolls Series, London,; 1875–85; Part I, CXC, 1475–88).

He also collected and arranged a number of Thomas' epistles.

References

External links

 

12th-century births
Abbots of Tewkesbury
Year of birth unknown
Year of death unknown
English Christian monks
12th-century English people
12th-century Christian monks